Dabur Vatika Miss Nepal 2005, 11th Miss Nepal pageant took place at the Birendra International Conference Convention Centre on April 7, 2005, in Nepal. It was won by Sugarika KC, of Lalitpur.

The show was broadcast live by Nepal Television but suffered from minor technical glitches.

The winner, Sugarika KC, represented Nepal in the Miss World 2005 pageant in Sanya, China. The 1st runner up, Shavona Shrestha, represented Nepal in the Miss Earth 2005 and 2nd runner up Ayushma Pokharel represented Nepal at Miss Earth 2006 pageant in Manila, Philippines.

Results

Color keys

Sub-Titles

Contestants

References

External links
 Miss Nepal website
 Miss Nepal 2005 Website

Beauty pageants in Nepal
2005 in Nepal
Miss Nepal